Sold Out may refer to:

The act of selling out, the compromising of one's integrity, morality and principles in exchange for money, success or other personal gain
Sold Out Sales & Marketing, a low-cost software distributor owned by Mastertronic
Sold Out: A Threevening with Kevin Smith, 2008
Sold Out (Squirrel Nut Zippers album), 1997
Sold Out (The Kingston Trio album), 1960
Sold Out (DJ Paypal album), 2015
Sold Out (Loboda album), 2020
Sold Out (In Stereo), a 2002 live album by Jason Mraz
"Sold Out," a song by Sleater-Kinney from their 1995 album Sleater-Kinney
"Sold Out", a song by Hardy from his 2023 album The Mockingbird & the Crow
Sold Out, a 1997 band simulation video game featuring music composed by Jeff Pfeifer and Rob Pfeifer
 Sold Out (book) (2015) non-fiction by Michelle Malkin and John Miano, displacement of white-collar professionals by temporary-foreign worker programs